Soltanabad (also Romanized as Solţānābād) is a village in Dul Rural District, in the Central District of Urmia County, West Azerbaijan Province, Iran. At the 2006 census, its population was 150, in 32 families.

References 

Populated places in Urmia County